Jeremy G. Butler (born 1954) is a scholar of television and film, an author, and radio show host on Alabama Public Radio. He is a professor emeritus of film studies at the University of Alabama. Butler has also taught at Northwestern University and the University of Arizona. In 1991, he founded the still-active Screen-L mailing list for academic film and television studies.  Butler also created and maintains ScreenSite for film/TV studies and ScreenLex, a pronunciation guide.

His University of Alabama profile page says he has a B.A. from Brown University and received an M.A. and PhD from Northwestern University.

Much of his work focuses on television studies. He has written on various subjects including television, Miami Vice, and film scholar Chuck Kleinhans. He wrote a book on television style. He also authored the textbook Television: Visual Storytelling and Screen Culture. He hosts the show All Things Acoustic on Alabama Public Radio.

Bibliography
The Sitcom (2019)
Television Style (2009)
Television: Critical Methods and Applications, four editions 1994–2012, fifth edition 2018 retitled Television: Visual Storytelling and Screen Culture 
Star Texts: Image and Performance in Film and Television (1992)

External links
Official webpage
All Things Acoustic (radio show)
Screen-L (academic film and television mailing list)
ScreenSite (researching and teaching film, television and new media)
ScreenLex (pronunciation guide for media studies)

References

1954 births
Living people
Film educators
University of Alabama faculty
Brown University alumni
Northwestern University alumni
Northwestern University faculty
University of Arizona faculty
American male writers